Nasibash (Näsibaş) is a rural locality (a selo) and the administrative centre of Nasibashevsky Selsoviet, Salavatsky District, Bashkortostan, Russia. The population was 951 as of 2010. There are 7 streets.

Geography 
Nasibash is located 15 km east of Maloyaz (the district's administrative centre) by road. Kalmaklarovo is the nearest rural locality.

References 

Rural localities in Salavatsky District